Beverly Hyman Fead is an American artist, author and documentary film maker.

Early life
Fead was born in Seattle as Beverlye Fisher, July 16, 1934. She and her family moved to California and settled in West Los Angeles. She went to Beverly Hills High School, and then graduated from Hamilton High School. She went to UCLA.

Fead was a painter and had exhibitions around the country. Her other artistic endeavors included photography, designing home interiors, writing and designing ceramics. In Deruta, Italy she designed ceramics which she sold in the United States in major restaurants and department stores such as One Pico in Shutter's California, Saks Fifth Avenue in Santa Barbara, California, and Stella Mare's Restaurant .

Cancer diagnosis and response
She was diagnosed with Stage IV uterine stromal sarcoma in 2002 and given two months to live. After seeing several doctors, she accepted an experimental treatment of Lupron shots every four months and a daily pill of Femora instead of the traditional chemotherapy and operation that had been prescribed. She is now leading a healthy and fulfilling life managing her cancer. Since then, she has written and had published two award-winning books: I Can Do This: Living With Cancer,  and Nana, What's Cancer?, which aims to explain cancer to children. She produced an award-winning short documentary called  Stage IV: Living With Cancer  She speaks publicly in the US about improving self-esteem, and on learning how to age gracefully.

She writes a blog called "Aging In High Heels", which she has turned into her third book. It can be found on Amazon. She speaks publicly to cancer patients and senior citizens on how to improve their quality of life.

Awards and recognition
She was an honoree and keynote speaker at the 100th year celebration of the American Cancer Society in Santa Barbara at the El Encanto Hotel. She is also a Legislative Ambassador and Hero Of Hope for the American Cancer Society's central coast region. In 2009, she received the Courage Award from the Sarcoma Foundation of America as well as the Gift of Life Award from the Jennifer Diamond Cancer Foundation.

In 2015, she was invited to speak at a briefing at the U.S. Capitol Building in Washington D.C. for the Alliance for Aging Research's launch of  The Silver Book®: Cancer. Since then she has now been invited to be an advocate for Global Healthspan Policy Institute.

Personal life
Beverlye Hyman married Bob Fead in 1992. She and her husband live in Santa Barbara, California. Between them they have four children and five grandchildren.

References

External links
 Aging In High Heels
 Beverlye Hyman Fead Interview Silver Screen Studios - Coming of Age - Episode 2 May 8, 2020)

Writers from Seattle
Living people
1934 births
University of California, Los Angeles alumni
Alexander Hamilton High School (Los Angeles) alumni